Sergi Escobar Roure (born 22 September 1974 in Lleida) is a Spanish world champion track cyclist who specialises in individual and team pursuit.

Career highlights 

 2001
 1st, Stage 6, Volta a Lleida
 3rd, National Championship, Road, ITT, Elite, Spain, Leon (ESP)
 1st, Mediterranean Games, Road, ITT, Elite
 2002
 1st, Overall, Cinturón Ciclista Internacional a Mallorca
 2003
 3rd, World Championship, Track, Pursuit, Elite, Stuttgart
 2003 World Cup
 1st, Pursuit, Moscow
 3rd, Pursuit, Cape Town
 1st, Stage 4, Vuelta a Alicante
 2nd, Overall, Cinturón Ciclista Internacional a Mallorca
 1st, Stage 1
 1st, Stage 4, Vuelta a León
 3rd, Overall, Volta Provincia Tarragona
 National Track Championships, Valencia
 1st, Pursuit

 2004
 World Championships, Melbourne
 1st, Pursuit
 3rd, Team Pursuit
 2004 World Cup
 1st, Pursuit, Aguascalientes
 3rd, Team Pursuit, Aguascalientes
 2nd, Pursuit, Manchester
 3rd, Overall, Vuelta a Alicante
 1st, Prologue
 National Track Championships, Palma de Mallorca
 1st, Pursuit
 1st, Madison (with Antonio Miguel Parra)
 1st, Stage 1, Cinturón Ciclista Internacional a Mallorca
 1st, Stage 3, Vuelta a Avila
Olympic Games, Athens
 3rd, Pursuit
 3rd, Team Pursuit
 2004–2005 World Cup
 3rd, Pursuit, Los Angeles

 2005
 2nd, Clásica de Almería
World Championships, Los Angeles
 2nd, Pursuit

 2006
 2005–2006 World Cup
 1st, Pursuit, Los Angeles
 3rd, Team Pursuit, Los Angeles
 National Track Championships
 1st, Pursuit
 1st, Team Pursuit
 1st, Overall, Vuelta a la Comunidad de Madrid

 2007
 National Track Championships
 1st, Pursuit, Elite
 1st, Team Pursuit
 1st, Points race
 World Championships, Palma de Mallorca
 3rd, Pursuit

 2008
 2007–2008 World Cup
 3rd, Los Angeles, Pursuit, Los Angeles
 1st, Pursuit, Copenhagen
 1st, Overall, Volta de Castello

External links
 

1974 births
Living people
Sportspeople from Lleida
Cyclists at the 2004 Summer Olympics
Cyclists at the 2008 Summer Olympics
Olympic bronze medalists for Spain
Olympic cyclists of Spain
Spanish male cyclists
UCI Track Cycling World Champions (men)
Olympic medalists in cycling
Medalists at the 2004 Summer Olympics
Spanish track cyclists
Cyclists from Catalonia
21st-century Spanish people